Viking Dahl (8 October 1895 - 5 January 1945) was a Swedish composer, active also as a painter and an author.

Biography
Frode Viking Samson Dahl was born in Osby in Scania, Sweden. He was the son of Samuel Dahl (1847-1932) and Katarina Lovisa Peterson (1859-1931). He was the grandson of Swedish priest  Gustav Leonard Dahl (1801-1877). His
elder brother was  Swedish-American Lutheran pastor and author K. G. William Dahl (1883-1917). His  cousin  was Swedish architect,  Frans Gustaf Abraham Dahl (1835-1927).

Dahl studied at the Royal College of Music 1915-1919 in Stockholm and thereafter in Copenhagen and Berlin. During a stay in Paris 1920, he wrote the dance drama Maison de Fous for Ballets Suédois.
He developed his own avant-gardism during his studies in Stockholm, and in Paris he met the radical French composers of the time, among them Darius Milhaud and Maurice Ravel.

When he returned to Sweden, Dahl worked as a piano and music teacher.  He was also an organist and choir director at  Varberg in Halland where he lived until his death.

References

External links

Free scores

Miscellaneous
Viking Dahl, biography (in Swedish)
Viking Dahl and the Piano, by Olof Höjer (in Swedish)

1895 births
1945 deaths
People from Osby Municipality
Swedish composers
Swedish male composers
Swedish artists
Royal College of Music, Stockholm alumni
People from Varberg Municipality
20th-century composers
20th-century Swedish male musicians
20th-century Swedish musicians